Michael Beer may refer to:

Michael Beer (cricketer) (born 1984), Australian cricketer
Michael Beer (poet) (1800–1833), German poet
Michael Beer, editor-in-chief of the ASCE-ASME Journal of Risk and Uncertainty in Engineering Systems